Elisabeth Pavel (born 1 September 1990 in Sibiu) is a Romanian professional female basketball player. She plays as a center for the Austrian AWBL club Flying Foxes Post SV Wien. Pavel is a member of Romania women's national basketball team.

Club career
In 2003-2004 she started her career for Magic Sibiu and then after four years moved to BC ICIM Arad in Divizia A. In EuroCup after 8 games Pavel averaged 7.6ppg, 5.4rpg, 1.4spg, FGP: 48.9%, FT: 68.2%.

After another season spent, she moved to CSM Satu Mare and then in 2010-2011 to Saces Dike Napoli in Italy. In 25 games her stats read 12.9ppg, 8.6rpg, 2.1spg, 2FGP: 51.4%, 3PT: 22.2%, FT: 57.3%. In 2011-2012, she improved to 15.2ppg, Reb-4 (9.7rpg), 1.9spg, FGP: 44.8%, 3PT: 35.4%, FT: 76.5%. Early in April she was number one amongst the players abroad. Elisabeth Pavel led Napoli to a victory over the fifth-ranked Firenze crushing them 81-59 in the A2 in Sunday night's game. Pavel was MVP of the game. She had a double-double by scoring 17 points and getting 15 rebounds. Pavel also added 4 blocks and 4 steals in 39 minutes on the court.

In the summer of 2012, she signed with the Austrian champions for a season. The Flying Foxes Wien have won the last six AWBL editions.

International career
Pavel is a member of Romania women's national basketball team. In the EuroBasket Women 2013 qualification, she averaged 10.2ppg in the 8 campaign games.

In the away match versus Spain, Pavel was MVP of the game despite the 54-68 loss. She scored 22 points and got 7 rebounds in 34 minutes on the court.

References

External links
 
 

1990 births
Living people
Centers (basketball)
Sportspeople from Sibiu
Romanian women's basketball players
European Games competitors for Romania
Basketball players at the 2019 European Games